Buket Atalay (born August 14, 1990) is a Turkish female Paralympian goalball player. She is a member of the national team.

Sporting career

Atalay competes for  Kahramanmaraş Gençlik Gücü SK in Kahramanmaraş.

She enjoyed the champion title with the national team at the 2015 IBSA Goalball European Championships Division A in Kaunas, Lithuania, which was a qualifier competition for the 2016 Paralympics.

She was a member of the women's national goalball team at the 2016 Paralympics in Rio de Janeiro, Brazil. She won the gold medal with her teammates at the Paralympics.

Honours

International
  2012 IBSA European Goalball Championships B in Ascoli Piceno, Italy
 2013 IBSA Goalball European Championships şn Konya, Turkey..
  Malmö Lady- and Men InterVup 2014, Sweden.
  2014 IBSA Goalball World Championships in Espoo, Finland
 2015 IBSA Goalball European Championships Div. A in Kauna, Lithuania.
  2016 Summer Paralympics in Rio de Janeiro, Brazil.

References

Living people
1990 births
Turkish sportswomen
Turkish blind people
Female goalball players
Turkish goalball players
Goalball players at the 2016 Summer Paralympics
Paralympic gold medalists for Turkey
Medalists at the 2016 Summer Paralympics
Paralympic medalists in goalball
Paralympic goalball players of Turkey
21st-century Turkish sportswomen